Morris Township may refer to:

Canada 
 Morris Township, Ontario, now part of the municipality of Morris-Turnberry

United States 
 Morris Township, Arkansas County, Arkansas in Arkansas County
 Morris Township, Grundy County, Illinois
 Morris Township, Sumner County, Kansas in Sumner County
 Morris Township, Stevens County, Minnesota
 Morris Township, New Jersey
 Morris township, Ramsey County, North Dakota in Ramsey County
 Morris Township, Knox County, Ohio
 Morris Township, Okmulgee County, Oklahoma, part of which is the city of Morris
 Morris Township, Clearfield County, Pennsylvania
 Morris Township, Greene County, Pennsylvania
 Morris Township, Huntingdon County, Pennsylvania
 Morris Township, Tioga County, Pennsylvania
 Morris Township, Washington County, Pennsylvania

See also
 Morris (disambiguation)
 Mount Morris Township (disambiguation)

Township name disambiguation pages